Edmundo Fernández Ripoll, better known as Edmond (born 1938), is a Catalan comic book artist and illustrator, born in 1938  march in Barcelona. His most famous creation was Jan Europa.

Career 
The young Edmond works in a hardware store, selling T-shirt's by mail and as an assistant in an advertising agency till 1959 when is hired by Editorial Bruguera to adapt television characters as Rintintín, Bonanza, Daniel Boone or Bronco. In the seventies also publishes romance stories in girls magazines like Celia, As de Corazones, Sissi, Sissi-gráfico o Sissi-juvenil and adaptations of books like Tom Sawyer and La capitana del Yucatán for Joyas Literarias Juveniles collection.

Lately he works internationally for the British market (Adarés Anglians, How The West Was Won, The Handcuff Hotspurs, The Quest, Tyler the Tamer), French bande dessiné (Brigade Temporelle, Mike Nelson), holandés (Elsje de Windt, Mimi, Meta de Bokesprong, Oberon), Swedish market and even in Zaire. In Spain, creates with the script of Víctor Mora Supernova (Súper Mortadelo, 1973) and with Andreu Martín Fantasía S. A. (Tío Vivo, 1975) and Los Titanes (Super Sacarino and Super Ases).

In 1976 creates Eva Star for Can Can and in April 1979, Jan Europa, his more popular series, to Mortadelo.

Similar to Jan Europa is Doctor Impossible in 1984. His last creation was Fede y sus colegas, dramón urbano por entregas, scripted by Jaume Ribera for the TBO magazine of Ediciones B.

Style 
Armando Matías Guiu wrote about this author

Work

References

Sources 
 Cuadrado, Jesús (2000). Atlas español de la cultura popular: De la historieta y su uso 1873-2000, Madrid: Fundación Germán Sánchez Ruipérez. 2 v. .

External links
 Edmond (Edmundo Fernández Ripoll) in the Comiclopedia by Lambiek
 Entry in the Bedetheque

1938 births
Living people
Comics artists